Steven Arthur Garratt (born 5 July 1953 in Nottingham) is an English cricket umpire.

Also a policeman, Garratt was appointed to the England and Wales Cricket Board's first-class umpires panel for the 2008 season, having spent the previous five seasons on the reserve list. He has also officiated in international women's cricket.

References

External links

1953 births
Living people
Cricketers from Nottingham
English cricket umpires